Karen Jade Cal (born February 11, 1989), professionally known as Kaye Cal, is a Filipino singer-songwriter who rose to popularity after becoming a grand finalist of the first season of the talent competition Pilipinas Got Talent, in which she competed in as the lead singer of Ezra Band. She has since been performing as a solo artist and has released several singles.

Early life
Karen Jade Cal was born on February 11, 1989, in Davao del Sur, Philippines, to Christian parents.

Career
Kaye Cal met her future Ezra Band bandmates in her hometown, Davao del Sur. The group eventually competed in the first season of Pilipinas Got Talent, where they became grand finalists. The covers the group performed on the show were released in the Pinoy You Got It album, which is a compilation of songs from the contestants on the show. Their covers of The Corrs' "Runaway" and Eric Clapton's "Wonderful Tonight" were included on the album, along with their original song "Walang Iba" (lit. "No one else"). Kaye garnered attention for her deep, soulful masculine voice, which led to confusion regarding her gender. In an interview with Pep PH in 2010, she revealed that she received surprised reactions from people upon learning that she is a woman since she also "dressed like a man".

The band has since gone on hiatus, starting Kaye Cal's career as a solo artist. She started uploading her covers on YouTube regularly, which gained popularity such as her cover of Up dharma Down's song "Tadhana". She released her first single "Isang Araw" in 2015 along with an accompanying music video. The song was part of OPM Fresh, an album that featured up-and-coming OPM artists. Kaye Cal signed with Star Music when the head of the label, Roxy Liquigan, told his team to look for her because he strongly believed in her talent and was attracted to her voice. In March 2017, Kaye released her self-titled debut album which featured nine tracks, including two original songs ("Rosas" and "Mahal Ba Ako ng Mahal Ko"), three covers, and her past singles ("Walang Iba", "Nyebe" , "Isang Araw" and "Give Me A Chance"). In August 2017, Kaye won the OPM Revival of the Year at the 2017 MOR Pinoy Music Awards for the single "Give Me A Chance". She also won the Star Music's Listener's Choice Award at the 2017 Himig Handog Awards for "The Labo Song".

Kaye Cal was a member of ASAP Jambayan from the segment's launch on October 15, 2017, until February 2018.

Personal life
Kaye Cal has stated that she is "a proud lesbian" and member of the LGBT community, although her sexuality is not accepted by her religious parents, which she admitted is a struggle during an interview with Boy Abunda on his talk show in 2017. In 2010, Kaye initially admitted she was a tomboy and dressed masculine but denied being a lesbian, citing her religion and involvement with the church as a reason, and believed same-sex relationships were wrong but stated she meant no offense to lesbians. She has since been open about her sexuality.

Kaye's masculine voice and appearance has also gained attention since competing on Pilipinas Got Talent and was a subject of discussion among the public. She addressed rumors surrounding her voice in an interview with ABS-CBN in August 2017 and denied taking testosterone medications along with the rumors that she's transgender, clarifying that's she's a lesbian.

Discography
Kaye Cal (2017)

Kaye Cal track list

 Ikaw Lang
 Mahal Ba Ako ng Mahal Ko
 Why Can't It Be
 Rosas
 Kung Ako na lang Sana
 Walang Iba
 Isang Araw
 Nyebe
 Give Me A Chance

Filmography

Awards and nominations

Concerts

References

1989 births
Living people
Star Magic
Filipino women pop singers
People from Davao del Sur
Singers from Laguna (province)
Singers from Davao del Sur
Tagalog people
Filipino LGBT singers
Participants in Philippine reality television series
Filipino YouTubers
ABS-CBN personalities
Star Music artists
21st-century Filipino women singers
Lesbian musicians
20th-century Filipino LGBT people
21st-century Filipino LGBT people